Sir John Wray, 3rd Baronet (21 September 1619 – October 1664) was an English politician who sat in the House of Commons in 1654.

Wray was the son of Sir John Wray, 2nd Baronet and his wife Grisella Bethell, daughter of Sir Hugh Bethell of Ellerton, Yorkshire. He matriculated from Magdalene College, Cambridge at Easter 1635 and was awarded MA in 1636.

In 1654, Wray was elected Member of Parliament for Lincolnshire for the First Protectorate Parliament. He succeeded his father as baronet in December 1655.
 
Wray died at the age of 45 and was buried at Glentworth, Lincolnshire on 29 October 1664. He was succeeded in the baronetcy by his cousin Christopher, 2nd Bt., of Ashby

Wray married firstly Elizabeth D'Ewes, widow of Sir Simonds D'Ewes, by whom he had no issue. He married secondly, in 1661, Sarah Evelyn, daughter of Sir John Evelyn of West Dean, Wiltshire, by whom he left a daughter and heiress. After his death, Sarah married Thomas Fanshawe, 2nd Viscount Fanshawe.

References

1619 births
1664 deaths
Alumni of Magdalene College, Cambridge
Baronets in the Baronetage of England
English MPs 1654–1655